The Campeonato Argentino de Rugby 2002  was won by the selection of Buenos Aires

The 24 teams participating were divided on three levels : "Campeonato", "Ascenso", "Desarrollo".

"Campeonato" 
Si torna al Pool unico a 6 teams

 Ranking:

"Ascenso"

Pool South 

 Ranking:

Pool North 

 Ranking

Semifinals

Final

  Promoted: Salta
 Relegated: Entre Rios and Austral

"Desarollo" (development) 
New name and formula for the third level of the championship

Pool North 

 Ranking

Promossa: Santiago de l'Estero

Pool South

External links 
  Memorias de la UAR 2002
  Francesco Volpe, Paolo Pacitti (Author), Rugby 2003, GTE Gruppo Editorale (2002)

2002
Argentina
2002 in Argentine rugby union